Bufi is a surname. Notable people with the surname include:

 Aldo Bufi Landi (1923–2016), Italian film actor
 Ylli Bufi (born 1948), Albanian politician